The Seekers, also called The Brotherhood of the Seven Rays, were a group of rapturists or a UFO religion in mid-twentieth century Midwestern United States. The Seekers met in a nondenominational church, the group originally organized in 1953 by Charles Laughead, a staff member at Michigan State University in East Lansing, Michigan. They were led by Dorothy Martin from the Chicago area (also called Sister Thedra), who believed a UFO would save them from a catastrophe on December 21, 1954. They are believed to be the earliest UFO religion. 

Martin told her followers that the United States was going to be destroyed by a massive earthquake and huge tidal wave on December 21, 1954, according to telepathic messages that she claimed to have received from aliens. She called the aliens the Guardians and said they came from a planet called Clarion. Believers would be saved from the destruction by flying saucers that would take them to Clarion.

The Seekers were the subject of the book When Prophecy Fails by Leon Festinger, in which Laughead was given the pseudonym Dr. Armstrong and Martin the name Marian Keech. Festinger infiltrated the Seekers with the goal of studying their cognitive reactions and coping mechanisms when their beliefs failed, a thought-process which Festinger named cognitive dissonance. When the UFO did not come, a majority of the members became convinced that the UFO would arrive on Christmas Eve, at which time their second disappointment produced even greater dissonance. In the book, Festinger and his colleagues write, "The experiences of this observer well characterize the state of affairs following the Christmas caroling episode—a persistent, frustrating search for orders." After this incident, many of the members returned home and abandoned their initial belief. Those who did not claimed that their group's belief and faith had saved the world from the disaster the aliens had warned of.

From this study, Festinger and his colleagues developed the cognitive dissonance theory. Cognitive dissonance results when two cognitions contradict each other, creating psychological discomfort. There are four main principles on which cognitive dissonance is based. The most important is whether any two cognitions are relevant or not. If they are relevant, then they are either dissonant or consonant – if dissonant, psychological discomfort arises. People are ultimately motivated to diffuse this arousal.

There are a few ways to reduce dissonance. One can change one's behavior to bring it in line with dissonant cognitions. Alternatively, one can change the dissonant cognition. One can also add new consonant cognitions, or subtract dissonant cognitions, thus either reducing the perception of choice or the importance of the conflict. In The Seekers, members changed their dissonant cognition the first time the UFO did not come, and reduced the importance of the conflict by going home the second time.

References

Sources
 
 

 

1954 in the United States
Christian new religious movements
UFO religions
Religious belief systems founded in the United States